Dajana Eitberger (born 7 January 1991) is a German luger.  She currently represents Germany in the women's singles event in the Luge World Cup.

Career
During the 2014–15 Luge World Cup season she was victorious in one event which was the final race of the season in Sochi. During that season she came in second twice and third four time and finished second in the overall standing behind her teammate, Natalie Geisenberger.  The event in Sochi and doubled as the European championship and as such she is the current European champion.

During the 2015–16 Luge World Cup Eitberger was on the winners platform on the podium once (at the season opener in Igls), was second twice and third three times. She once again finished the season sixth in the standings.

Eitberger won the silver medal at the 2018 Olympics in Pyeongchang, again behind Natalie Geisenberger. She missed the 2019/20 season due to childbirth, subsequently returned to competition, but finished the 2021–22 Luge World Cup outside of the top ten, and did not qualify for the 2022 Olympics.

References

External links

1991 births
Living people
People from Ilmenau
German female lugers
Sportspeople from Thuringia
Olympic lugers of Germany
Olympic silver medalists for Germany
Olympic medalists in luge
Lugers at the 2018 Winter Olympics
Medalists at the 2018 Winter Olympics